The Financial Stability Institute (FSI) is one of the bodies hosted by the Bank of International Settlements (BIS) at its headquarters in Basel, Switzerland. Established in 1999 by the BIS and the Basel Committee on Banking Supervision, its primary role is to improve the co-ordination between national banks regulators through holding seminars and acting as a clearing house for information on regulatory practice.

Purpose
It was set up in response to the East Asian financial crisis of 1997, as the result of a perceived weakness in co-ordination between national regulators in matters of training and general understanding of financial systems. As a result, its work is concentrated in the regulators of the non-G-10 nations.

List of chairmans
Josef Tosovský, 1 December 2000 – 31 December 2016.
Fernando Restoy, 1 January 2017– present.

Publications
The FSI has released 11 occasional papers, of which two have detailed the expectations of the various global regulators regarding Basel II implementation in their jurisdictions.

References

External links

The Kids Allowance App
Business Advisory Services
Innovative Financial Solutions

Financial regulation
International banking institutions